is the oldest published Japanese text on garden-making. It was most likely the work of Tachibana Toshitsuna.

Sakuteiki is most likely the oldest garden planning text in the world. It was written in the mid-to-late 11th century. Later during the Kamakura period, it was referred to as the Senzai Hisshō, or the Secret Selection on Gardens before it acquired the title Sakuteiki in the Edo period.

Overview
The unillustrated Sakuteiki is the first systematic record of the styles of gardening in the Heian period, which had been the product of oral tradition for many years. It precisely defines the art of landscape gardening as an aesthetic endeavor based on poetic feeling of the designer and the site. It enumerates five styles of gardening, including
 the "Ocean Style" (taikai no yō)  
 the "Mountain Torrent Style" (yama kawa no yō) 
 the "Broad River Style" (taiga no yō) 
 the "Wetland Style" (numa ike no yō) 
 the "Reed Style" (ashide no yō) 

The Sakuteiki was written in a time during which the placing of stones was the most important part of gardening, and it literally defined the art of garden making, using the expression ishi wo tateru koto to mean not only stone placement but garden making itself. It advises the reader not only how to place the stones but also how to follow the "desire" of the stones.

See also
 Japanese garden
 Japanese rock garden

Notes

References 
 Takei, Jiro and Marc P. Keane. (2001). Sakuteiki Visions of the Japanese Garden: A Modern Translation of Japan's Gardening Classic. Boston, Massachusetts: Tuttle Publishing. 
 Kuitert, Wybe, (2002)  Themes in the History of Japanese Garden Art, Hawaii University Press, Honolulu, (Online as PDF)

Gardening in Japan
Gardening books
Heian-period books